"La Temperatura" is a song by Colombian singer Maluma featuring Puerto Rican singer Eli Palacios. The song is taken from the mixtape PB.DB The Mixtape. It was released as the mixtape's first single on 11 June 2013, by Sony Music Colombia. The song was commercially successful across countries in Latin America, reaching the top ten on the charts in Colombia and peaking at number 24 on the Billboard Hot Latin Songs chart.

Music video
The music video for "La Temperatura" premiered on 3 July 2013 on Maluma's Vevo account on YouTube. The music video was directed by 36 Grados and has surpassed over 350 million views on YouTube.

Charts

Weekly charts

Year-end charts

Certifications

References

2013 singles
2013 songs
Maluma songs
Spanish-language songs
Latin pop songs
Sony Music Colombia singles
Sony Music Latin singles
Songs written by Maluma (singer)